Theodor Gotthilf Leutwein (9 May 1849 – 13 April 1921) was colonial administrator of German Southwest Africa from 1894 to 1904 (as commander of its Schutztruppe, and from 1898, governor).

Life and career 

Born in Strümpfelbrunn in the Grand Duchy of Baden, he joined the Prussian Army in 1868. Following several promotions he achieved the rank of major in 1893. In 1894 he replaced Curt von François as commander of the Schutztruppe (Imperial Security Troop). His personal goal in German Southwest Africa was to create "colonialism without bloodshed". During his tenure there, Leutwein created a decentralized administration with three regional centers (Windhoek, Otjimbingwe and Keetmanshoop). The construction of the first railroad between Windhoek and the seaport of Swakopmund was built during his rule. In 1899 he was promoted to lieutenant colonel, rising to the rank of colonel in 1901.

His policies with the native Africans, which he called the "Leutwein System", was a mixture of diplomacy, "divide-and-rule" and military coercion. His relationship with the indigenous Namaqua and Herero tribes were tenuous at best. Conversely, he was often criticized by German colonists as being too lenient with the Africans. In 1904 an uprising by the Herero was the beginning of the end of his colonial leadership. Soon afterwards, Wilhelm II replaced Leutwein with the notorious General Lothar von Trotha. In May 1904 he admitted that the Germans had not taken one Herero prisoner, following an inquiry by the social democratic Reichstag deputy August Bebel.

In 1906, Leutwein published an autobiography, "Elf Jahre als Gouverneur in Deutsch-Südwestafrika" ("Eleven Years as Governor in German South West Africa"), an historical account of his career in German Southwest Africa. He died in Freiburg.

References

External links
 

1849 births
1921 deaths
People from Neckar-Odenwald-Kreis
Colonial people in German South West Africa
German Empire politicians
History of Namibia
People from the Grand Duchy of Baden
Schutztruppe personnel
Major generals of Prussia
Military personnel from Baden-Württemberg